Charles "Mailman" Flynn (born 6 November 1993, Lanark) is a professional boxer and Commonwealth gold medalist from Scotland.

Amateur career
Flynn competed in the men's lightweight division at the 2014 Commonwealth Games where he won the gold medal.

Flynn was also a lightweight boxing competitor in the 2011 Commonwealth Youth Games where he won the silver medal. He was the winner of the Editor's Award at the Sunday Mail Scottish Sports Awards 2014.

In the weeks following his Commonwealth Games success he gave an inspirational speech to the Scotland Rowing Team before the 2014 Commonwealth Rowing Championships.

Professional career

Flynn made his professional debut against Ibrar Riyaz on 14 December 2014 at a packed Thistle Hotel in Glasgow. Flynn claimed a 40-36 points win against the Englishman. The victory came four-and-a-half months after Flynn enjoyed success at Glasgow 2014.

Professional record 

| style="text-align:center;" colspan="8"|10 Wins (1 knockout, 9 decisions), 0 Losses, 2 Draws
|-style="text-align:center; background:#e3e3e3;"
|style="border-style:none none solid solid; "|Result
|style="border-style:none none solid solid; "|Record
|style="border-style:none none solid solid; "|Opponent
|style="border-style:none none solid solid; "|Type
|style="border-style:none none solid solid; "|Round, Time
|style="border-style:none none solid solid; "|Date
|style="border-style:none none solid solid; "|Location
|style="border-style:none none solid solid; "|Notes
|- align=center
|Draw
|10-0-2
|align=left| Ryan Collins
|
|
|
|align=left|
|align=left|
|- align=center
|Win
|10-0-1
|align=left| Fonz Alexander 
|
|
|
|align=left|
|align=left|
|- align=center
|Win
|9-0-1
|align=left| Liam Richards
|
|
|
|align=left|
|align=left|
|- align=center
|Draw
|8-0-1
|align=left| Ryan Collins
|
|
|
|align=left|
|align=left|
|- align=center
|Win
|8–0
|align=left| Abdon Cesar
|
|
|
|align=left|
|align=left|
|- align=center
|Win
|7–0
|align=left| Jordan Ellison
|
|
|
|align=left|
|align=left|
|- align=center
|Win
|6–0
|align=left| Lee Connelly
|
|
|
|align=left|
|align=left|
|- align=center
|Win
|5–0
|align=left| Sylwester Walczak 
|
|
|
|align=left|
|align=left|
|- align=center
|Win
|4–0
|align=left| Dan Carr
|
|
|
|align=left|
|align=left|
|- align=center
|Win
|3–0
|align=left| Qasim Hussain
|
|
|
|align=left|
|align=left|
|- align=center
|Win
|2–0
|align=left| Andy Harris
|
|
|
|align=left|
|align=left|
|- align=center
|Win
|1–0
|align=left| Ibrar Riyaz
|
|
|
|align=left|
|align=left|

Personal life
Flynn is a native of Newarthill, Lanarkshire.

During the Commonwealth Games, Flynn was quoted post fight as saying "the Mailman delivers", referencing the fact that he worked in the sorting office of the Royal Mail and has used the nickname "The Mailman" since, having it displayed on his fight shorts.

In January 2018, Flynn announced his engagement to his partner Amber Farquhar.

References

1993 births
People from Newarthill
Scottish people of Irish descent
Scottish male boxers
Lightweight boxers
Commonwealth Games gold medallists for Scotland
Boxers at the 2014 Commonwealth Games
Living people
Commonwealth Games medallists in boxing
Medallists at the 2014 Commonwealth Games